Barabad or Borabad or Bor Abad may refer to:
 Barabad, Khvaf
 Barabad, Sabzevar